The Evangelical Reformed Church, until 2009 Evangelical Reformed Church – Synod of Reformed Churches in Bavaria and Northwestern Germany is a Calvinist member church of the Evangelical Church in Germany (EKD).

It has its seat in Leer (East Frisia). The church has 165,798 parish members in 142 parishes (December 2020) and is one of the two reformed churches within the EKD. Member of the Reformed Alliance. It belonged also to the Confederation of Evangelical Churches in Lower Saxony, and joined 2003 of the Union of Evangelical Churches in Germany. It is also a member of the Community of Protestant Churches in Europe. The main church of the Evangelical Reformed Church is the Große Kirche ("great church") in Leer.
Since 2021  Susanne Bei der Wieden is bishop of Evangelical Reformed Church in Germany.

Practices 
Ordination of women and blessing of same-sex marriages are allowed.

References

External links 
 Evangelical Reformed Church 
 Evangelical Church in Germany  

Reformed denominations in Germany
Member churches of the Evangelical Church in Germany

Church in East Frisia
EvangelicalReformed
EvangelicalReformed
Huguenot history in Germany